Puto cuchinta or kutsinta is a type of steamed rice cake (puto) found throughout the Philippines. It is made from a mixture of tapioca or rice flour, brown sugar and lye, enhanced with yellow food coloring or annatto extract, and steamed in small ramekins. It bears resemblance to the Burmese mont kywe the and Indonesian and Malaysian kuih kosui.

The cooked cakes are topped with fresh grated meat from mature coconut. It is consumed year-round as a merienda or snack, and is frequently sold along with puto. Unlike its counterpart, which has a doughy texture, kutsina has a jelly-like, chewy consistency. It can be also enhanced by adding latik for a sweeter taste.

Preparation
Add the lye water to the melted brown sugar. Then, mix it with the glutinous rice flour and rice flour until dissolved thoroughly. Strain after to remove lumps; you may add a red liquid food color. Brush the mold with vegetable oil and steam it until the top is set when touched. After removing from heat, cool it down before removing from the mold using a spatula. Lastly, top it with grated coconut or use it as a dip. It can also be substituted with grated cheese or a yema sauce.

See also
 Puto
 Putli mandi
 Philippine cuisine
 List of steamed foods

References

Philippine desserts
Philippine rice dishes
Foods containing coconut
Steamed foods
Rice cakes